Veritas College is a residential college of Shantou University. It was established in July 2008, the first residential college in mainland China. Veritas College's purpose was to organize various academic and community activities with the expectation of enriching the educational experience and extra-curricular life of the residential students. This change from a traditional dormitory format was intended to encourage residential students from different majors to socially network, share knowledge and ideas, develop interpersonal relationships, and strengthen their confidence, independence and sense of social responsibility.

Motto, Flag and badge
The motto of Veritas College is 诚，敬，谦，和. In English, this fairly translates as "Sincerity, Respect, Modesty, Harmony."

Location
The college is located in Jinping District, Shantou, Guangdong Province, near the east gate of Shantou University.

Courses, camps and activities
Veritas College provides not only living accommodations, but also a place for learning and sharing. At Veritas College, residential students come from a range different colleges and majors. Veritas College has its own student union and clubs, which serve as a platform for students to make friends, share experiences, and learn from each other. The college also provides students additional extracurricular courses and camps.

Student Union and Other Organizations

Student Union
Founded in 2008, the Student Union hosts various activities to serve students. The most famous and popular activities are the welcoming and farewell parties. There are 8 departments, that help the Student Union work efficiently in all aspects. The president and council of the Student Union are selected by all student residents.

Ivy League
Founded in 2009, the Ivy League club is a volunteer organization. It has a council with a president and two vice presidents. The leadership council helps run the whole organization, including 7 departments and a volunteer group. The most popular activities involve assisting high school students, working with young children, a summer camp, and the TEDx Talk at STU.

The Youth League Branch
The Youth League Branch of Veritas College is associated with the China Communist Youth League. The Youth League aims to educate the youth on, and promote, the values of the Communist Party.

Monitors
Founded in 2008, the monitors are special representatives of Veritas College. The monitors usually are junior students. They serve as role models in academic, moral, and other personal aspects. They are selected to guide the freshmen in adapting to college life, and also serve as mentors. Monitors themselves are trained and supervised.

The Party Branch
The Party Branch of Veritas College refers to the campus branch of the Chinese Communist Party. Usually its activities are closed to its own members.

The Veritas College Magazine
Founded in 2008, this is a magazine for all student residents. It features articles about college life. It is published at the beginning of the semesters, and is produced by a group of journalists and editors.

Clubs and Societies

The Polar Star Outdoor Expedition Club
Founded in 2013, the Polar Star Outdoor Expedition Club is a club for students who enjoy outdoor activities, such as climbing mountains, camping, etc. Every two years, the club holds a Chief ATP Camp to train members in teamwork and survival skills.

Lingxi Psychology Club
Founded in 2010, the club aims to provide professional psychology information and cultivate students' interest in mental health. The club is directed by instructor Dong-ping Jiang, who has a master in psychology.

Debate Team
Founded in 2008, Veritas College's debate team participates in regional and national tournaments.

Traditional Studies Club
Founded in 2009, the Traditional Studies Club was founded to enable students to participate in traditional culture studies. Members study Confucianism, Taoism, Laozi, traditional Chinese poems, etc.

Deyi Gu Qin Club
Founded in 2010, the Deyi Gu Qin Club is a club devoted to studying a traditional Chinese instrument, the Gu Qin. The club also holds the Gu Qin Culture Study Camp every year.

History 
The concept of residential colleges originated in Cambridge University, UK, but Hong Kong University (HKU) pioneered the first example in greater China. Professor Li Dan brought this concept to Shantou University after visiting HKU, which led to the establishment of the first residential college in mainland China. Other universities in mainland China have been motivated by Veritas College's example, and are starting their own residential colleges.

After only one year of operation, the student response to Veritas College at Shantou University was overwhelmingly positive. Because of ongoing student and faculty feedback, Shantou University has committed to establishing more residential colleges on the campus.

References

 
Shantou
Shantou
Educational institutions established in 2008
2008 establishments in China